The 2020 UK Music Video Awards were held on 5 November 2020 to recognise the best in music videos and music film making from United Kingdom and worldwide. The nominees were announced on 29 September 2020. 

Four new categories were included, R&B/Soul Video (uk, international and newcomer) and Best Lockdown Video, to recognize videos produced during the lockdowns that took place during 2020. Due to the COVID-19 pandemic in the United Kingdom the ceremony was held virtually. 

American producer DJ Shadow received the award for Video of the Year for "Rocket Fuel" alongside American hip-hop trio De La Soul, the video was directed by Sam Pilling.

Video of the Year

Video Genre Categories

Craft and Technical Categories

Special Video Categories

Individual and Company Categories

References

External links
Official website

UK Music Video Awards
UK Music Video Awards